2026 Cottrell, provisional designation , is a dark asteroid from the inner regions of the asteroid belt, approximately 12 kilometers in diameter.

The asteroid was discovered on 30 March 1955, by IU's Indiana Asteroid Program at Goethe Link Observatory near Brooklyn, Indiana, United States. It was named after American chemist Frederick Gardner Cottrell.

Orbit and classification 

Cottrell orbits the Sun in the inner main-belt at a distance of 2.2–2.7 AU once every 3 years and 10 months (1,398 days). Its orbit has an eccentricity of 0.12 and an inclination of 2° with respect to the ecliptic.

Physical characteristics

Lightcurves 

Two rotational lightcurve of Cottrell were obtained from photometric observations by astronomers at the Palomar Transient Factory in California. Analysis gave an identical rotation period of 4.499 hours for both lightcurves and a brightness variation of 0.42 and 0.44 magnitude, respectively.

In February 2012, photometry at the Etscorn Campus Observatory, New Mexico, gave a well-defined period of 4.4994 hours with an amplitude of 0.77 magnitude, which indicates that the body has a non-spheroidal shape.

Diameter and albedo 

According to the surveys carried out by the Japanese Akari satellite and NASA's Wide-field Infrared Survey Explorer with its subsequent NEOWISE mission, Cottrell measures between 11.43 and 14.279 kilometers in diameter and its surface has an albedo between 0.050 and 0.088.

The Collaborative Asteroid Lightcurve Link assumes a standard albedo for stony asteroids of 0.20 and consequently calculates a much smaller diameter of 7.46 kilometers based on an absolute magnitude of 13.0.

Naming 

This minor planet was named after American chemist Frederick Gardner Cottrell (1877–1948), who was a benefactor of the minor planet program at the discovering Goethe Link Observatory. The official  was published by the Minor Planet Center on 1 November 1978.

References

External links 
 Asteroid Lightcurve Database (LCDB), query form (info )
 Dictionary of Minor Planet Names, Google books
 Asteroids and comets rotation curves, CdR – Observatoire de Genève, Raoul Behrend
 Discovery Circumstances: Numbered Minor Planets (1)-(5000) – Minor Planet Center
 
 

002026
002026
Named minor planets
19550330